The 2021 CEBL season was the third season of the Canadian Elite Basketball League (CEBL). It began on June 24, 2021. The CEBL planned to have fans at the home arenas, depending on the situation of the pandemic but would have had regional bubbles if needed. On June 10, 2021, the league announced that teams would be playing at their home arenas, but fans are still dependant on the provincial governments. On June 21, 2021, the league announced the playoffs would start on August 14, where four teams will play for two spots in the Championship Weekend. The final two spots will be filled in by the top team in the league and by the host team, Edmonton Stingers. The Championship Weekend will be held from August 18 to 22. Starting July 21, all seven teams were allowed to bring some amount of fans (either full capacity or limited) to the home games. The Edmonton Stingers defeated the Niagara River Lions 101–65 for their 2nd consecutive CEBL title, becoming the league's first back-to-back champions.

Regular season

Standings

Results

Playoffs

Bracket

Quarter-finals

Championship Weekend

Semi-finals

Final

Awards
Source:
Player of the Year: Xavier Moon Edmonton Stingers
Canadian Player of the Year: Lindell Wigginton Hamilton Honey Badgers
U Sports Developmental Player of the Year: Lloyd Pandi Niagara River Lions
Defensive Player of the Year: Brandon Gilbeck Fraser Valley Bandits
Referee of the Year: Perry Stothaert
Clutch Player of the Year: Lindell Wigginton Hamilton Honey Badgers
Coach of the Year: Jermaine Small Edmonton Stingers
6th man of the year: Adika Peter-McNeilly Edmonton Stingers
CEBL Final MVP: Xavier Moon Edmonton Stingers

All-CEBL teams

All Canadian team
Source:

Forwards
Shaquille Keith, Fraser Valley Bandits
Tommy Scrubb, Niagara River Lions
Jordan Baker, Edmonton Stingers
Guards
Alex Campbell, Fraser Valley Bandits
Lindell Wigginton, Hamilton Honey Badgers

Statistics

Individual statistic leaders

References

External links 

Canadian Elite Basketball League
2020–21 in Canadian basketball
CEBL season
Sports in Canada